= Northern Sumatra =

Northern Sumatra may refer to:

- The northern portion of the island of Sumatra
- Aceh, the northernmost province of Sumatra
- North Sumatra, the province south of Aceh
